is a Japanese kickboxer, currently competing in the super lightweight division of Krush. A professional competitor since 1999, he is the former Krush Super Featherweight champion, the former AJKF Lightweight champion and the 2003 AJKF Lightweight Tournament winner.

Kickboxing career

AJKF

AJFK lightweight champion
Otsuki challenged the reigning AJKF lightweight champion Aou Hayashi at AJKF 2003 1th.BOUT - KICK ENERGY on January 4, 2003. He was awarded a third-round technical knockout, after knocking Hayashi down three times by the 1:32 minute mark.

After capturing the AJKF lightweight title, Otsuki participated in the 2003 AJKF lightweight tournament. Otsuki was booked to face Takahito Fujimasa in the quarterfinals, which were held on March 8, 2003. He won the fight by a first-round knockout. Otsuki faced Susumu Daigūji in the penultimate bout of the tournament on May 23, 2003. He won fight by a third-round knockout. Otsuki advanced to the tournament finals, held on the same day, where he faced Tsogto Amara. He won the fight by a second-round technical knockout.

Otsuki faced Andrea Ronchi in a non-title bout at AJKF 2003 KNOCK DOWN on September 27, 2003. Ronchi retired from the fight at the end of the fourth round.

Otsuki made his first AJKF lightweight title defense against Takahito Fujimasa at AJKF 2004 Wilderness on January 4, 2004. He won the fight by a first-round knockout, stopping Fujimasa with a spinning backfist near the end of the opening round. Otsuki vacated the title on September 25, 2004.

Post title reign
Otsuki challenged the reigning WPKC World muay thai champion Satoshi Kobayashi at AJKF Survivor on January 4, 2005. He won the fight by a third-round knockout.

Otsuki faced Masami Yamamoto at AJKF Solid Fist on November 12, 2006. He won the fight by unanimous decision, with scores of 30–28, 30–28 and 30–29. Otsuki next faced Jon Sung Min at AJKF New Year Kick Festival 2007 on January 4, 2007. He won the fight by a first-round knockout.

Otsuki's two-fight winning streak was snapped by Hiromasa Masuda at AJKF: Departure Norainu FINAL on March 9, 2007, who beat him by unanimous decision. Otsuki suffered his second consecutive loss on June 17, 2007, as Kupee Wor.Steera beat him by unanimous decision at AJKF's Thailand event.

Otsuki was booked to face Kanongsuk Weerasakreck in the quarterfinal bout of the AJKF 60kg tournament, which was held on August 25, 2007. He won the fight by a fifth-round technical knockout. Otsuki advanced to the semifinals, held on October 25, 2007, where he faced Naoki Maeda. He won the fight by unanimous decision. Otsuki fought Masahiro Yamamoto in the tournament finals, which were held on the same day. He lost the fight by unanimous decision.

Krush

Early Krush career
Otsuki made his K-1 promotional debut against David Douge at K-1 WORLD MAX 2008 World Championship Tournament FINAL 8 on July 7, 2008. He won the fight by a third-round knockout. Otsuki made his second K-1 appearance against Ryuji Kajiwara at K-1 World MAX 2008 World Championship Tournament Final on October 1, 2008. He won the fight by unanimous decision, with scores of 30–28, 29–28 and 30–29.

Otsuki made his Krush debut against Naoki Ishikawa at Krush 2 on March 14, 2009. He won the fight by a third-round knockout, flooring Ishikawa with a right hook late in the round. After winning his promotional debut, Otsuki was scheduled to participate in the 2009 Krush lightweight grand prix. Although he beat Hiroshi Iwakiri by a first-round technical knockout in the opening round of the tournament, he lost a majority decision to Masahiro Yamamoto in the quarterfinals, which were held on the same day.

Otsuki faced Akihiro Kuroda at Krush × Survivor on March 13, 2010. He won the fight by unanimous decision, with scores of 30–28, 30–28 and 30–29. Otsuki was unable to build on this victory however, as he lost a unanimous decision to Yoshimichi Matsumoto on May 2, 2010.

Otsuki returned from a three-year absence from the sport to face Taishi Hiratsuka at Krush 34 on November 10, 2013. He won the fight by a first-round knockout. Otsuki was next booked to face Tomohiro Oikawa in Oikawa's retirement fight at SHOOT BOXING 2013 on December 23, 2013. He won the fight by unanimous decision, after two extra rounds were contested. Otsuki extended his winning streak to three straight fights at Krush 37 on April 1, 2014, as he beat Junpei Aotsu by split decision, after an extra round was contested.

Krush super featherweight champion
His three fight winning streak earned Otsuki the chance to challenge the reigning Krush Super Featherweight champion Kan Itabashi at Krush 41 on May 11, 2014. He won the fight by unanimous decision, with scores of 28–26, 28–26 and 29–26.

Otsuki faced Hiroshi Momoi at NKB 2014 Kissui Series VOL.3 on June 15, 2014. He won the fight by a first-round technical knockout, stopping Momoi with a combination of punches after just 55 seconds. Otsuki vacated the title on October 17, 2014 as he was unable to make a title defense in the mandated time.

Otsuki faced Leona Pettas, in his first fight post-title reign, at Krush.50 on April 1, 2015. He won the fight by unanimous decision, with all three judges scoring the bout 27–25 in his favor.

NKB and KNOCKOUT
Otsuki faced Akira Takemura at NKB Yamato Damashii Series VOL.2 on April 11, 2015. He won the fight by a first-round stoppage, as Damashii's corner threw in the towel at the 1:36 minute mark. Otsuki next faced Hideki Soga at NJKF WINNERS 2015 2nd on May 17, 2015. He won the fight by unanimous decision, with scores of 49–47, 50–46 and 49–47.

Otsuki made his REBELS promotional debut against Yasuyuki at REBELS.38 on September 16, 2015. He lost the fight by a third-round technical knockout. Otsuki next faced Taison Maeguchi at NO KICK NO LIFE 2016 on March 12, 2016. Maeguchi won the fight by a third-round technical knockout.

Otsuki faced Hideki Soga at NJKF Superkick on April 10, 2016. He won the fight by a third-round knockout. Six months later, at SIAM WARRIORS SUPERFIGHTS on October 22, 2016, Otsuki won the ISKA Muay Thai Intercontinental Super Lightweight title with a first-round knockout of Saen Kransi. Otsuki was next booked to face Starboy Kwaythong Gym at the inaugural KNOCK OUT event on December 5, 2016. He won the fight by a first-round knockout.

Otsuki traded wins and losses over his next four fights. He first lost to Yuto Tsujide by a first-round knockout at HOOST CUP KINGS KYOTO 2 on March 5, 2017. Otsuki next beat Mitsuru Nakao by a first-round knockout at KNOCK OUT vol.5 on October 4, 2017. Two months later, at KNOCK OUT 2017 in Ryogoku on December 10, 2017, Otsuki suffered a third-round stoppage loss to Hikaru Machida. Otsuki rebounded from this loss with a second-round knockout of Yuma Yamaguchi at KNOCK OUT 2018 OSAKA 1st on May 3, 2018. Otsuki faced Yosuke Morii at KNOCK OUT SUMMER FES.2018 on August 19, 2018. Morii won the fight by a late second-round knockout.

Otsuki faced the Shootboxing Japan lightweight champion Renta Nishioka at SHOOT BOXING S-cup 65 kg World TOURNAMENT 2018 on November 16, 2018. He lost the fight by unanimous decision, with scores of 28–27, 28–26 and 28–26.

Otsuki was booked to face Reo Nomura at NKB Shutsujin Series vol.2 on April 13, 2019. He won the fight by unanimous decision, with scores of 30–28, 30–27 and 30–27.

Return to Krush
Otsuki faced Hitoshi Aketo at Krush 121 on January 23, 2021, in his promotional debut to Krush, following a two-year absence from competition. He won the fight by a third-round knockout, flooring Aketo with a right overhand.

Otsuki faced Hisaki Higashimoto at Krush 143 on November 26, 2022. He lost the fight by split decision, after an extra fourth round was contested.

Championships and awards
All Japan Kickboxing Federation
AJKF Lightweight Championship
One successful title defense
2003 AJKF Lightweight (-62kg) Tournament Winner
2007 AJKF Lightweight (-62kg) Tournament Runner-up
World Professional Kickboxing and Muay Thai Council
WPKC World Muay Thai Lightweight Championship
Krush
Krush Super Featherweight (-60kg) Championship
International Sport Karate Association
ISKA Muay Thai Intercontinental Super Lightweight Championship

Kickboxing record 

|-  bgcolor="#fbb"
| 2022-11-26|| Loss ||align=left| Hisaki Higashimoto || Krush 143 || Tokyo, Japan || Ext.R Decision (Split) ||4  ||3:00  

|-  bgcolor="#cfc"
| 2021-01-23|| Win||align=left| Hitoshi Aketo || Krush 121 || Tokyo, Japan || KO (Right Overhand)|| 3 ||  1:00
|-  bgcolor="#CCFFCC"
| 2019-04-13 || Win ||align=left| Reo Nomura || NKB Shutsujin Series vol.2 || Tokyo, Japan || Decision (Unanimous) || 3 || 3:00
|-  bgcolor="#FFBBBB"
| 2018-11-18 || Loss||align=left| Renta Nishioka || SHOOT BOXING S-cup 65 kg World TOURNAMENT 2018 || Tokyo, Japan || Decision (Unanimous)|| 3 || 3:00
|-  bgcolor="#FFBBBB"
| 2018-08-19 || Loss||align=left| Yosuke Morii || KNOCK OUT SUMMER FES.2018 || Tokyo, Japan || KO (Punches) || 3 || 2:52
|-  bgcolor="#CCFFCC"
| 2018-05-03 || Win ||align=left| Yuma Yamaguchi || KNOCK OUT 2018 OSAKA 1st || Osaka, Japan || KO (Punches) || 2 ||  1:20
|-  bgcolor="#FFBBBB"
| 2017-12-10 || Loss||align=left| Hikaru Machida || KNOCK OUT 2017 in Ryogoku || Tokyo, Japan || TKO (Corner Stoppage) || 3 || 2:07
|-  bgcolor="#CCFFCC"
| 2017-10-04 || Win ||align=left| Mitsuru Nakao || KNOCK OUT vol.5 || Tokyo, Japan || KO (Punches) || 1 || 2:49
|-  bgcolor="#FFBBBB"
| 2017-03-05 || Loss ||align=left| Yuto Tsujide || HOOST CUP KINGS KYOTO 2 || Tokyo, Japan || KO (Left Straight) || 1 || 2:39
|-  bgcolor="#CCFFCC"
| 2016-12-05 || Win||align=left| Starboy Kwaythong Gym || KNOCK OUT Vol.0 || Tokyo, Japan || KO (Punches) || 1 || 2:39
|-  bgcolor="#CCFFCC"
| 2016-10-22 || Win||align=left| Saen Kransi || SIAM WARRIORS SUPERFIGHTS || Tokyo, Japan || KO (Punches) || 1 || 2:39
|-
! style=background:white colspan=9 |
|-  bgcolor="#CCFFCC"
| 2016-04-10 || Win||align=left| Hideki Soga || NJKF Superkick || Tokyo, Japan || TKO (Punches) || 3 || 2:39
|-  bgcolor="#FFBBBB"
| 2016-03-12 || Loss||align=left| Taison Maeguchi || NO KICK NO LIFE 2016 || Tokyo, Japan || TKO (Doctor Stop) || 3 || 0:47
|-  bgcolor="#FFBBBB"
| 2015-09-16 || Loss||align=left| Yasuyuki || REBELS.38 || Tokyo, Japan || TKO (Corner Stoppage)|| 3 || 0:50
|-  bgcolor="#CCFFCC"
| 2015-05-17 || Win ||align=left| Hideki Soga || NJKF WINNERS 2015 2nd || Tokyo, Japan || Decision (Unanimous)|| 5 || 3:00
|-  bgcolor="#CCFFCC"
| 2015-04-11 || Win ||align=left| Akira Takemura || NKB Yamato Damashii Series VOL.2 || Tokyo, Japan || TKO (Corner stoppage) || 1 || 1:36
|-  style="background:#CCFFCC;"
| 2015-01-04|| Win ||align=left| Leona Pettas || Krush.50 || Japan || Decision (Unanimous) || 3 || 3:00
|-  style="background:#CCFFCC;"
| 2014-06-15|| Win ||align=left| Hiroshi Momoi || NKB 2014 Kissui Series VOL.3 || Japan || TKO (Punches) || 1 || 0:55
|-  style="background:#CCFFCC;"
| 2014-05-11|| Win ||align=left| Kan Itabashi || Krush 41 || Tokyo, Japan || Decision (Unanimous) || 3 || 3:00
|-
! style=background:white colspan=9 |
|-  style="background:#CCFFCC;"
| 2014-01-04|| Win ||align=left| Junpei Aotsu || Krush 37 || Tokyo, Japan || Ext.R Decision (Split) || 4 || 3:00
|-  style="background:#CCFFCC;"
| 2013-12-23|| Win ||align=left| Tomohiro Oikawa || SHOOT BOXING 2013 || Osaka, Japan || 2nd Ext.R Decision (Unanimous) || 7 || 3:00
|-  style="background:#CCFFCC;"
| 2013-11-10|| Win ||align=left| Taishi Hiratsuka || Krush 34 || Tokyo, Japan || KO (Left Hook) || 1 || 1:09
|-  style="background:#cfc;"
| 2010-05-09|| Win ||align=left| Kenkaw Lukprabat || Adison Stadium ||Saraburi, Thailand ||  KO (Left hook to the body)|| 1 || 2:21
|-  style="background:#FFBBBB;"
| 2010-05-02|| Loss ||align=left| Yoshimichi Matsumoto || K-1 World MAX 2010 –63 kg Japan Tournament ||Tokyo, Japan ||  Decision (Unanimous)|| 3 || 3:00
|-  style="background:#CCFFCC;"
| 2010-03-13|| Win ||align=left| Akihiro Kuroda || Krush × Survivor || Tokyo, Japan || Decision (Unanimous) || 3 || 3:00
|-
|-  bgcolor="#FFBBBB"
| 2009-07-24 || Loss||align=left| Masahiro Yamamoto || Krush Lightweight Grand Prix 2009 〜Round.1〜, Quarter Finals || Tokyo, Japan || Decision (majority) || 3 || 3:00
|-  bgcolor="#CCFFCC"
| 2009-07-24 || Win||align=left| Hiroshi Iwakiri || Krush Lightweight Grand Prix 2009 〜Round.1〜, First Round || Tokyo, Japan || TKO (Two knockdown rule) || 1 || 2:31
|-  style="background:#cfc;"
| 2009-03-14|| Win||align=left| Naoki Ishikawa || Krush 2 || Tokyo, Japan || KO (Right Hook)|| 3 || 2:37
|-  bgcolor="#CCFFCC"
| 2008-10-01 || Win||align=left| Ryuji Kajiwara || K-1 World MAX 2008 World Championship Tournament Final || Tokyo, Japan || Decision (Unanimous) || 3 || 3:00
|-  bgcolor="#CCFFCC"
| 2008-07-07 || Win||align=left| David Douge|| K-1 WORLD MAX 2008 World Championship Tournament FINAL 8|| Tokyo, Japan || KO (3 Knockdowns/Left Hook) || 3 || 2:59
|-  bgcolor="#FFBBBB"
| 2007-10-25 || Loss ||align=left| Masahiro Yamamoto || AJKF: The Best of 60 kg Tournament 2007 Final, Final || Tokyo, Japan || Decision (Unanimous) || 5 || 3:00
|-  bgcolor="#CCFFCC"
| 2007-10-25 || Win ||align=left| Naoki Maeda || AJKF: The Best of 60 kg Tournament 2007 Final, Semi Final || Tokyo, Japan || Decision (Unanimous) || 3 || 3:00
|-  bgcolor="#CCFFCC"
| 2007-08-25 || Win||align=left| Kanongsuk Weerasakreck|| AJKF: The Best of 60 kg Tournament 2007, Quarter Final|| Tokyo, Japan || TKO (Left Hook) || 5 || 2:21
|-  bgcolor="#FFBBBB"
| 2007-06-17 || Loss||align=left| Kupee Wor.Steera|| AJKF Thailand||  || Decision (Unanimous) || 5 || 3:00
|-  bgcolor="#FFBBBB"
| 2007-03-09 || Loss||align=left| Hiromasa Masuda|| AJKF: Departure Norainu FINAL|| Tokyo, Japan || Decision (Unanimous) || 3 || 3:00
|-  bgcolor="#CCFFCC"
| 2007-01-04 || Win||align=left| Jon Sung Min|| AJKF New Year Kick Festival 2007 || Tokyo, Japan || KO (Body Punches) || 1 || 2:07
|-  bgcolor="#CCFFCC"
| 2006-11-12 || Win||align=left| Masami Yamamoto|| AJKF Solid Fist || Tokyo, Japan || Decision (Unanimous) || 3 || 3:00
|-  bgcolor="#FFBBBB"
| 2005-12-19 || Loss||align=left| Chonlek Kaewsamrit||Siam Omnoi Boxing Stadium|| Bangkok, Thailand || TKO || 4 ||
|-  bgcolor="#CCFFCC"
| 2005-01-04 || Win||align=left| Satoshi Kobayashi || AJKF Survivor || Tokyo, Japan || KO (Punches)|| 3 || 2:31
|-
! style=background:white colspan=9 |
|-  bgcolor="#CCFFCC"
| 2004-10-17 || Win||align=left| Mustapha Ziani|| AJKF|| Tokyo, Japan || Decision (Majority)|| 3 || 3:00
|-  bgcolor="#CCFFCC"
| 2004-04-16 || Win||align=left| Chae Yeon Ik|| AJKF|| Tokyo, Japan || KO || 2 || 2:08
|-  bgcolor="#CCFFCC"
| 2004-01-04 || Win||align=left| Takahito Fujimasa|| AJKF 2004 Wilderness|| Tokyo, Japan || KO (Back Fist)|| 1 || 2:22
|-
! style=background:white colspan=9 |
|-  bgcolor="#CCFFCC"
| 2003-09-27 || Win||align=left| Andrea Ronchi|| AJKF 2003 KNOCK DOWN|| Tokyo, Japan || TKO (Corner Stoppage) || 4 || 3:00
|-  bgcolor="#CCFFCC"
| 2003-05-23 || Win||align=left| Tsogto Amara|| AJKF Lightweight Tournament, Final|| Tokyo, Japan || TKO (Doctor Stoppage)|| 2 || 0:37
|-
! style=background:white colspan=9 |
|-  bgcolor="#CCFFCC"
| 2003-05-23 || Win||align=left| Susumu Daigūji|| AJKF Lightweight Tournament, Semi Final|| Tokyo, Japan || KO (Left Hook)|| 3 || 2:21
|-  bgcolor="#CCFFCC"
| 2003-03-08 || Win||align=left| Takahito Fujimasa|| AJKF Lightweight Tournament, Quarter Final|| Tokyo, Japan || KO (Right Straight) || 1 || 1:41
|-  bgcolor="#CCFFCC"
| 2003-01-04 || Win||align=left| Aou Hayashi|| AJKF 2003 1th.BOUT - KICK ENERGY || Tokyo, Japan || KO (3 Knockdowns/Right Hook) || 3 || 1:32
|-
! style=background:white colspan=9 |
|-  bgcolor="#CCFFCC"
| 2002-07-21 || Win||align=left| Aou Hayashi|| AJKF || Tokyo, Japan || TKO (3 Knockdowns/Punches) || 1 || 1:46
|-  bgcolor="#CCFFCC"
| 2002-03-30 || Win||align=left| Hiromasa Masuda|| MA Japan Kick|| Tokyo, Japan || KO (Right Middle Kick)|| 1 || 0:53
|-  bgcolor="#CCFFCC"
| 2001-04-06 || Win||align=left| Atsushi Tateshima|| AJKF|| Tokyo, Japan || KO (Right Uppercut)|| 5 || 1:10
|-  bgcolor="#CCFFCC"
| 2000-11-29 || Win||align=left| Soul Tiger Han|| AJKF|| Tokyo, Japan || KO || 1 || 1:41
|-  bgcolor="#CCFFCC"
| 2000-10-22 || Win||align=left| Naoyuki Sugie|| AJKF|| Tokyo, Japan || KO || 1 || 2:03
|-  bgcolor="#CCFFCC"
| 2000-09-13 || Win||align=left| Makoto Hasegawa|| AJKF|| Tokyo, Japan || KO || 1 || 2:31
|-  bgcolor="#CCFFCC"
| 2000-07-30 || Win||align=left| Naoki Maeda|| AJKF|| Tokyo, Japan || KO || 1 || 2:05
|-  bgcolor="#CCFFCC"
| 2000-03-16 || Win||align=left| Masashi Kamon|| AJKF|| Tokyo, Japan || Decision (Unanimous) || 3 || 3:00
|-  bgcolor="#CCFFCC"
| 1999-10-08 || Win||align=left| Tomoyuki Morishita|| AJKF|| Tokyo, Japan || KO || 1 || 1:12
|-
| colspan=9 | Legend:

See also
 List of male kickboxers
 List of Krush champions

References

1973 births
Living people
Japanese male kickboxers
Sportspeople from Kyoto